Herbaspirillum seropedicae is a betaproteobacteria which is an endophytic diazotroph and forms nitrogen-fixing associations with maize (Zea mays), rice (Oryza sativa), sorghum (Sorghum bicolor), sugar cane (Saccharum officinarum), bananas (Musa) and pineapple (Ananas comosus). H. seropedicae is a potential nitrogen biofertilizer. Studies have shown that rice with H. seropedicae inoculated increases the yield to an equivalent of 40 kg N/ha.

References

External links
Type strain of Herbaspirillum seropedicae at BacDive -  the Bacterial Diversity Metadatabase

Burkholderiales
Bacteria described in 2004